Mohammad-Reza Hedayati (in Persian : محمد رضا هدایتی, born 14 May 1973 in Zabol) is an Iranian actor .
He is known for his comedy roles in TV series directed by Mehran Modiri.

Music album

Track list
To (in English : You)
Polha (in English : Bridges)
Yadete (in English : Do You Remember?)
Aber (in English : Passer By )
Nimkat Choobi (in English : Wooden Bench )
Sekeye Khorshid (in English : The Coin of the Sun)
Barg O Bad (in English : The Leaf and the Wind )
Divarha (in English : The Walls )
Medley (in English : Medley)

 Singles  Moshtagh (in English : WISTFUL)Saye (in English : Shadow)Yadeteh (in English : Do You Remember?)Sistani (in English : Sistani)

Filmography

TV seriesMarde Do Hezar Chehreh (in English : Two-Thousand Face Man)Bagh-e Mozaffar (in English : Mozaffar's Garden)Dastan-haye Noroozi (The Adventures of Noroozi)Dar Cheshm-e Baad (In the eye of the wind)Vakil-e Mahalleh (Neighborhood's Advocate)Afzooneh khah-e kouchakSefr darajeh (Zero Degree)Shab-haye Barareh (Nights Of Barareh)Noghteh-chin (Dotted)Pavarchin (Tiptoes)Pelak-e 14 (No. 14)Bebakhshid Shoma? (Excuse me, You?)Ghahve-ye Talkh (Bitter Coffee) Dor zadan mamnooCinemaBivafa (Unfaithful)Sham-e arousi (Wedding Dinner)Elaheh-ye ZigoratteDalghak (The Clown)Rooz-e Karnameh (Report-card Day'')

See also
Seyyed Javad Razavian
Siamak Ansari
Reza Shafiei Jam

External links

Mohammad Reza Hedayati's Official Website

Soore University alumni
Living people
Iranian male actors
1973 births

Resources